South Africa produces in excess of 255 million tonnes of coal (2011 estimate) and consumes almost three-quarters of that domestically. As of 2018, South Africa was the seventh largest producer and consumer of coal in the world. This large industry, means that as of 2015 about 80,000 workers, or .5% of total employment, was from the coal industry, down from a peak in 1981 of 135,000 workers. The coal industry is South Africa's largest contribution to the greenhouse gases that cause climate change.

Around 77% of South Africa's energy needs are directly derived from coal. South Africa is the 5th largest exporter of coal in the world, with 30% consumed overseas. 92% of coal consumed on the African continent is produced in South Africa. 80% of South Africa's  emissions come from the energy supply which is dependent on coal, which produced the vast majority of the country's energy, or 42GWs. In negotiations leading up to the COP26 Climate Conference in Glasgow, South Africa and its partner countries reached a $8.5 billion Climate finance package to end end its reliance on coal. The use of coal in South Africa dates back to the Iron Age (300–1880 AD), when charcoal (note: not coal, but charred wood) was used to melt iron and copper, but large-scale exploitation of coal did not occur until the mid-19th century.

Geology
 

The largest coal deposits in South Africa are to be found in the Ecca deposits, a stratum of the Karoo Supergroup, dating from the Permian period, between 280 and 250 Ma. The Ecca Group is extensive, covering around two-thirds of South Africa (much of it covered by slightly younger rocks - see diagram on the left). Only the northern and north-eastern portion of these Ecca deposits is coal-bearing, but it nevertheless contains more than a third of all coal reserves in the Southern Hemisphere.

Notable coalfields are:

 Waterberg Coalfield
 Highveld Coalfield
 Witbank Coalfield
 Ermelo Coalfield
 Utrecht Coalfield
 Klip River Coalfield

Economic impact

South Africa is one of the seven largest coal-producing and one of the top five coal-exporting countries in the world.

More than a quarter of coal mined in South Africa is exported, most of which leaves the country via Richards Bay. Coal is South Africa's third largest source of foreign exchange; platinum being the largest and gold second. Around 15% of the country's GDP (2000 estimate) is spent on energy and 77% of that is derived from coal.

In 2004, the coal and lignite mining industry generated a gross income of R39 billion and directly employed 50,000 people.

The Witbank Coalfield accounts for 40% of South Africa's coal production.

Mining
The five largest coal mining companies account for around 85% of all production. They are Anglo American plc, South32's South Africa Energy Coal, Sasol Mining, Glencore Xstrata, and Exxaro .

Open-pit mining account for roughly half of South African coal mining operations, the other half being sub-surface.

Coal consumption

Electricity generation

Electricity generation accounts for 43% of all coal consumed in South Africa (1997 estimate).

Many of the country's coal-fired power station are located in close proximity to a coal mine and are supplied with fuel directly from the mine.
The Grootegeluk open cast mine on the Waterberg Coalfield in Limpopo is one of the largest in the country and feeds the Matimba Power Station with about 14.6 million tons of coal a year via a conveyor system. The mine is also contracted to supply the new Medupi Power Station.

Liquid fuel

Around 35% of liquid fuel used in South Africa is derived from coal mined by Sasol Mining at the Secunda CTL plants.

Household use
In 1995 around a million lower-income households in South Africa depended on coal as their primary energy source for cooking, lighting and heating. This number has been decreasing steadily during the first decade of the 21st century due to the expansion of electricity supply to lower-income households and rural regions.

Environmental impact

Environmentalists in South Africa and abroad have criticized the decision of the World Bank's approval for a $3.75 billion loan to build the world's fourth-largest coal-fired power in South Africa.  The plant will increase the demand for coal mining and production.  Protesters are urging the bank to stop supporting the development of coal plants and other large emitters of greenhouse gas and polluting operations from coal mining.

Usage of coal and liquid fuel derived from coal accounts for around 86% of the 113 million tons of carbon dioxide emissions South Africa produces annually (2006 estimate) and represents around 40% of Africa's total coal derived CO emissions.

The largest contributor to coal-derived air pollution, in Gauteng, is household coal usage (65%), followed by industry (30%) and electricity generation (5%).

Some coal mines have been abandoned by their owners, mainly due to companies ceasing to exist. Many of these mines, such as the Transvaal and Delagoa Bay Collieries (T&DB) outside Witbank, have not been rehabilitated prior to being abandoned and are a major source of water and air pollution. It is estimated that clean-up and rehabilitation of the T&DB Collieries will cost around R100 million. Coal seam fires were common, but controlled, at T&DB Collieries during the mine's operation, but the fires have been left to burn out of control since the mine was closed in 1953, to the extent that in 1995 flames could be seen above ground.

See also
 Coal mining
 List of coalfields

References

Citations

Bibliography
 Thomas Schlüter & Martin H. Trauth (2006). "Geological atlas of Africa: with notes on stratigraphy, tectonics, economic geology, geohazards and geosites of each country", Birkhäuser, 

 
Mining in South Africa